Idaho is a jazz song written by Jesse Stone.

Stone's early writings show a deep blues influence. An early success was "Idaho", recorded by several artists, with the Benny Goodman version peaking at #4 (pop) in 1942.  The recording by Guy Lombardo sold three million copies.

References

1942 songs
Songs written by Jesse Stone